The President Vanishes (released in the United Kingdom as Strange Conspiracy) is a 1934 American political drama film directed by William A. Wellman and produced by Walter Wanger. Starring Edward Arnold and Arthur Byron, the film is an adaptation of Rex Stout's political novel of the same name.

Upon its release, the film was praised for its ensemble cast but author John Douglas Eames, in his 1985 book The Paramount Story, stated that, even with "an accomplished cast and an out-of-the-rut story,  The President Vanishes couldn't buck moviegoers' apathy towards political subjects".

Premise
The film follows the story of The President Vanishes.

Cast
 Edward Arnold — Secretary of War Wardell
 Arthur Byron — President Craig Stanley
 Paul Kelly — Chick Moffat
 Peggy Conklin — Alma Cronin
 Andy Devine — Val Orcott
 Janet Beecher — Mrs. Stanley
 Osgood Perkins — Harris Brownell
 Sidney Blackmer — D.L. Voorman
 Edward Ellis — Lincoln Lee
 Irene Franklin — Mrs. Orcott

Hays Code
Upon its release in 1934, The President Vanishes was named by the National Legion of Decency — an organization of the United States Catholic Church — as one of Hollywood's problematic and "immoral" films. The Catholic Church demanded an implementation and enforcement of a set of industry censorship guidelines to control and remove content that the church saw as immoral. Threatened by a large scale boycott of all Hollywood films, Will H. Hays, then president of Motion Picture Association of America, came to an agreement with the church that saw the establishment of Production Code Administration and passage of the Motion Picture Production Code, also known as Hays Code. The Hays Code was in use from 1934 until 1968 when it was abandoned in favor of the MPAA film rating system.

Reception
The film recorded a loss of $145,948.

See also
 1934 in film
 Cinema of the United States
 List of American films of 1934

References

External links
 

1934 films
American political drama films
Films directed by William A. Wellman
Films about fictional presidents of the United States
Rex Stout
Films produced by Walter Wanger
American black-and-white films
1930s political drama films
1934 drama films
Paramount Pictures films
1930s English-language films
1930s American films